Aliénor Tricerri (born 20 March 1980) is a Swiss former tennis player.

Tricerri won four singles titles and 21 doubles titles on the ITF Women's Circuit in her career. On 20 September 1999, she reached her best singles ranking of world number 286. On 18 September 2000, she peaked at number 203 in the doubles rankings.

In July 2001, Tricerri appeared in Switzerland Fed Cup team.

ITF Circuit finals

Singles (4–8)

Doubles (21–13)

Fed Cup participation

Singles

Doubles

External links
 
 
 
 Official website 

1980 births
Living people
Tennis players from Geneva
Swiss female tennis players